Bill Brown was a member of Donald Bradman's famous Australian cricket team, which toured England in 1948. Bradman's men went through their 34 matches without defeat; this unprecedented feat by a Test side touring England earned them the sobriquet The Invincibles.

An experienced right-handed opening batsman, Brown was on his third visit to England, having first toured in 1934 before World War II. However, Brown's best years were lost to the war and by 1948 Sid Barnes and Arthur Morris had superseded him in the pecking order to become Australia's first-choice opening pair. Brown was selected as a reserve opener; this decision generated controversy among critics who believed he was past his best.

Bradman rotated the three openers in the tour matches, but Morris and Barnes were preferred in the Tests. Bradman accommodated Brown in his first-choice team by playing him out of position in the middle order in the Tests. However, Brown appeared uncomfortable in the unfamiliar role, and was dropped after making 73 runs at a batting average of 24.33 in the first two Tests.

Despite his struggles in the Test arena, Brown had success in the tour matches as an opener. He scored 1,448 runs at 57.92 in all first-class matches, ranking fourth in both the aggregates and averages. He scored eight centuries, second only to Bradman, including 200 against Cambridge University. However, Brown gained criticism for his slow batting. Following his omission from the Test team, Brown batted in a highly circumspect manner to increase the reliability and volume of his scoring. A very occasional off spin bowler, Brown took his career first-class best of 4/16 in his only stint with the ball, against the South of England.

Background
Brown had been a regular member of the Australian Test team since his debut in 1934, and immediately after World War II, he captained Australia in the inaugural Test against New Zealand. However, he was sidelined by injury in 1946–47 and Sid Barnes and Arthur Morris opened in the Tests, averaging 73.83 and 71.85 respectively. Brown resumed his Test career in the following season, replacing Barnes, but he was dropped after scoring 29 runs in two Tests. Barnes then came in and made 139 runs in the next two Tests, including a 112 in the Fourth Test. Morris was then rested for the Fifth Test to allow Brown another chance to show his ability and make a case for continued national selection, and he made 99. In the Tests against India during the season, Barnes, Morris and Brown had shared the opening duties; their batting averages were 43.00, 52.25 and 42.66 respectively. In any case, Brown had done enough to tour England with The Invincibles in 1948, his third trip there, although Barnes and Morris were the first-choice opening combination.

Early tour
Australia traditionally fielded its first-choice team in the tour opener, which was customarily against Worcestershire. Brown gained selection, although Bradman batted him out of position in the middle order while Barnes and Morris opened. Brown came in 6/335 and scored 25 at a typically placid pace, accumulating his runs at a lower strike rate than the other recognised batsmen. He was out with the score at 6/402 as Australia went on to declare at 8/462 and win by an innings.

In the next match against Leicestershire, Bradman rested Morris, so Brown opened with Barnes. Brown scored 26 in an opening stand of 46, as Australia amassed 448 and won by an innings.

The Australians proceeded to play Yorkshire at Bradford, on a damp pitch suitable for slower bowling. In the first innings, Brown took three catches from the bowling of Keith Miller—who had resorted to bowling off spin—as Yorkshire were bowled out for 71 in difficult batting conditions. Opening with Morris while Barnes was rested, Brown made 13 as the match remained finely balanced after Australia was bowled out for 101. Brown took another catch from Miller in the second innings as the hosts were bowled out for 89. Chasing 60 for victory, Brown fell to Frank Smailes for two as the Australian top order collapsed to 6/31—effectively seven wickets down with the injured Sam Loxton unable to bat—before scraping home by four wickets.

Brown was rested for the next match against Surrey, which Australia won by an innings. After the first four matches, five Australians hade made centuries, and another had passed fifty. Brown had scored only 66 runs with a highest score of 26, while Morris and Barnes, the incumbent openers, had scored 223 and 298 runs with a century and fifty apiece.

Brown was recalled for the match against Cambridge University, opening with Morris while Barnes rested. After putting on 64 for the opening wicket with Morris, Brown added 176 for the second wicket with Ron Hamence. He added a further 140 for the fourth wicket with Lindsay Hassett, who was captaining the team while Bradman rested himself. Brown top-scored with 200 and Hassett declared when his double-centurion was out with the score at 4/414. Australia went on to win by an innings. In the following match against Essex, Brown opened with Barnes while Morris was rested. The pair put on 145 in 97 minutes—the highest opening stand by the Australians on the tour to that point—before Barnes was out hit wicket. In the meantime, Brown had reached 50 in 90 minutes. Bradman came in and he and Brown accelerated to put on a second-wicket partnership of 219 in 90 minutes, before the latter was out for 153 from three hours of batting with the score at 2/364. Brown had scored his last 100 runs in less than 90 minutes. Australia went on to score 721 runs on the first day, the highest number of runs amassed in one day of first-class cricket, before completing victory by an innings and 451 runs, their largest winning margin for the tour. Opening with Morris while Barnes was rested, Brown completed his third century in as many innings with 108 against Oxford University, after putting on an opening stand of 139. This meant that he had scored 461 runs in eight days of cricket, and put him atop the batting aggregates, ahead of Bradman. Australia went on to complete their fourth successive innings victory.

The next match was against the Marylebone Cricket Club (MCC) at Lord's. The MCC fielded seven players who would represent England in the Tests, and were basically a full strength Test team, while Australia fielded their first-choice team. Bradman installed Barnes and Morris as his preferred opening pair, while Brown batted out of position at No. 6. Barring one change in the bowling department, the same team lined up in the First Test, with the top six batsmen in the same positions. It was a chance for players from both sides to gain a psychological advantage, but Brown failed to capitalise. He came to the crease with the score at 4/280 to join Keith Miller and scored 26 in a stand of 63 before being dismissed as Australia amassed 552 and won by an innings. This was followed by Australia's first non-victory of the tour, against Lancashire, a draw for which Brown was rested.

Brown returned for the following match, which was against Nottinghamshire, and added 122 to register his fourth century in less than three weeks. Australia made 400 but the hosts hung on for a draw in the second innings. In the next match against Hampshire, Brown opened with Barnes and made a duck as Australia were dismissed for 117 on a damp pitch in reply to the home side's 195. It was the first time the tourists had conceded a first innings during the summer. Hampshire were subsequently bowled out in their second innings for 103 to leave Australia a target of 182. This time Barnes fell for a duck, and Brown anchored Australia to an eight-wicket win with an unbeaten 81 after a century second-wicket partnership with Ian Johnson. The final match before the First Test was against Sussex. Opening with Morris, Brown played second fiddle, accumulating 44 as the pair put on an opening stand of 153. Morris went on to 184 and Australia declared at 5/549 before completing another innings victory.

First Test

Up to this point, Brown—who was on his third tour of England—had scored 800 runs on tour at an average of 72.72, with a double century, three other centuries and 81 not out, In contrast, middle-order batsman Neil Harvey struggled in the initial stages of his first tour of England. Harvey failed to pass 25 in his first six innings, and although he had scored an unbeaten 100 against Sussex, he had totalled only 296 runs at 42.29. As a result, Brown gained selection in the First Test at Trent Bridge, batting out of position in the middle order while Barnes and Morris opened, whereas Harvey was dropped despite making a century in Australia's most recent Test against India.

England batted first and made 165, with Brown prominent in the field. Early on the first day of play, Brown caught England opener Cyril Washbrook on the run at the fine leg boundary after the batsman had attempted to hook a Ray Lindwall bouncer, leaving England at 2/15 after 41 minutes of play. He later made a series of one-handed stops in the field, helping to keep the pressure on the batsmen. Brown took his second catch of the innings to remove Alec Bedser, who had featured in a rearguard fightback to help take England to 165 after they had fallen to 8/74.

On the second day, Barnes and Bradman took the score to 1/121 before Barnes and Miller were dismissed without further addition to the score. All the while, Australia had been scoring slowly, as they would throughout the day. Brown came in at No. 5 to join Bradman, but he had played most of his career as an opening batsman and he looked uncomfortable in the middle order, but Bradman brought him in ahead of Hassett as the new ball was due and Brown was used to starting his innings against pace bowlers and a new ball. English captain Norman Yardley removed Jim Laker from the attack and took the second new ball. Bradman struck his first boundary in over 80 minutes and the run rate picked up somewhat, prompting England to revert to slower bowling. Australia passed England's total before Yardley brought himself on to bowl and trapped Brown—who was attempting to push the ball to mid-on—leg before wicket (lbw) with an off cutter in his first over. This ended a 64-run stand in 58 minutes and left Australia at 4/185. Following the departure of Brown, the scoring slowed as Bradman changed the team strategy to one of attempting to bat only once. Australia eventually reached 509, and after England compiled 441 in their second innings, Brown was not needed as Australia made the 98 runs required victory for the loss of only two wickets.

Between Tests, Brown was rested for the match against Northamptonshire, which Australia won by an innings. He returned for the second fixture against Yorkshire. Opening with Barnes, Brown made 19 as Australia took a 43-run first innings lead. In the second innings, Brown top-scored with 113. He combined with Bradman to add 154 runs for the second wicket as the match petered into a draw. In a patient and restrained display, Brown took four hours to make his century. Following his controversial selection for the tour, Brown was attempting to justify his position in the team by accumulating a large number of runs, but earned criticism for being too dour. However, the century was enough to see him retain his middle-order position for the Second Test at Lord's, where Australia fielded an unchanged team. Former Test leg spinner and teammate Bill O'Reilly—who was in England as a journalist—criticised the selection of Brown, who had appeared to be noticeably uncomfortable in the unfamiliar role. He said that despite Brown's unbeaten double century in his previous Test at Lord's in 1938, Sam Loxton and Neil Harvey had better claims to selection.

Second Test

Australia won the toss and batted first at the home of cricket. Centurion Morris fell at 3/166 and new batsman Miller was trapped lbw for four shortly after. Brown came in at 4/173 and helped Lindsay Hassett rebuild the innings after the two quick wickets. Both men scored slowly, averaging more than three and half minutes for each run. After putting on a partnership of 43, Hassett was bowled by Yardley, who then trapped Brown for 24 to leave Australia stumbling at 6/225. Brown had hit two consecutive half-volleys off his pads through the leg side for four, and attempted a third boundary in a row to a similar delivery. However, this third delivery came off the pitch more quickly and beat Brown for pace. Australia managed to avoid further collapse a counterattack from the tail saw them to 350 before they bowled England out for 215. The tourists batted much more productively in the second innings in ideal weather on the third day. Brown joined Miller after Bradman fell at 4/329; Australia had lost 3/33 but steadied to reach stumps at 343 without further loss, with Brown on seven. After the rest day, Australia resumed with a lead of 478 runs and six wickets in hand. The morning was punctuated by three rain stoppages. Just ten minutes after the start, heavy rain intervened. The weather cleared and Miller and Brown moved to lunch on 63 and 32 respectively, with Australia at 4/409. In 88 minutes of play, Australia had added 117 runs. Brown was caught behind from Alec Coxon after lunch without adding to his score for 32, after an 87-run partnership with Miller, with the score at 5/416. Bradman eventually declared at 7/460, 595 runs ahead. It would take a world record chase from England to win the match. The home team lost wickets regularly and fell for 186 to lose by 409 runs. Although part of a successful team, Brown was unable to replicate the centuries he made in each of his two previous Tests at Lord's on the preceding tours, and it was to be the last Test of his career.

The next match was against Surrey and started the day after the Test. Brown injured a finger while fielding in the first innings, so he was unable to bat in Australia's first innings. In the second innings, Australia's makeshift openers Harvey and Sam Loxton chased down the 122 runs for victory to complete a 10-wicket win in less than an hour.

Dropped

Brown was rested for the following match against Gloucestershire before the Third Test. Loxton scored 159 not out, featuring in two century partnerships and propelling Australia to 7/774 declared, which was its highest score of the tour and laid the foundation for an innings victory. Loxton's effort was enough to oust Brown from his middle-order position for the Third Test at Old Trafford. According to O’Reilly, Brown had appeared out of place in the middle-order because he was used to the opener's classical role of defending against and wearing down the opening bowlers, rather than attacking. During the Test, which was drawn, Barnes was injured and off spinner Ian Johnson was used as a makeshift opener as Morris was the only specialist left after Brown's omission. Afterwards, Brown managed only eight as Australia defeated Middlesex by ten wickets in their only county match between Tests.

Barnes was still unavailable for the Fourth Test, but Brown was not recalled to open with Morris; instead, Hassett was promoted to open with Morris, while the teenaged Harvey came into the middle-order. Although Hassett failed with only 13 and 17 in his two innings, Harvey struck 112 in the first innings, before Australia chased down 404 on the final day to set a world record for the highest successful run-chase in Test cricket and won by seven wickets.

Brown partnered the recovered Barnes and patiently scored 140, before being the fifth man out with the score at 344, as Australia amassed 456 and defeated Derbyshire by an innings immediately after the Fourth Test. Looking to regain his Test position by sheer weight of runs, Brown started slowly; Barnes made 24 of the first 29 runs. He took 185 minutes to reach 50, much to the displeasure of the restless spectators, before accelerating and scoring his next 50 runs in 37 minutes.

In the next match against Glamorgan, Brown scored 16 in a rain-affected draw that did not reach the second innings. He scored 33 and seven in the following match, falling both times to the leg spin of Eric Hollies as Australia defeated Warwickshire by nine wickets. Brown was then rested as Australia faced and drew with Lancashire for the second time on the tour. He returned for the non-first-class match against Durham, scoring 49 out of Australia's 282 in a weather-affected draw that failed to reach the second innings. Brown was overlooked for selection in the Fifth Test at The Oval. Barnes returned to the team and Australia crushed England by an innings and 149 runs to take the series 4–0 after cutting them down for only 52 in the first innings.

Later tour matches

Seven matches remained on Bradman's quest to go through a tour of England without defeat. Australia batted first against Kent and Brown top-scored with 106. After putting on 64 with Morris for the first wicket, he put on 104 each for the next two partnerships with Bradman and Harvey respectively, before falling at 3/272. Brown again batted slowly; he took 255 minutes to reach triple figures and was greeted by ironic clapping as he slowly accumulated runs while his partners attacked. Brown's dismissal triggered a collapse; Australia lost their last seven wickets for 89 to end at 361. Despite this, they completed another innings victory. In the next match against the Gentlemen of England, which was held at Lord's, Brown scored 120, featuring in a 180-run second wicket partnership with Bradman, as Australia amassed 5/610 and won by an innings. Former Australian Test opener and batting partner Jack Fingleton said "Brown has always looked the class batsman that he is when playing at Lord's, and this superb century, so different in conception and execution to the one at Canterbury [against Kent], made one reflect what a grand opening batsman this series of Tests had done without". Fingleton made a duck in the next match but Australia nevertheless defeated Somerset by an innings and 374 runs. He then made 13 against the South of England in his last first-class match of the season. The match was washed out, but not before Brown took 4/16 from 4.1 overs in his only first-class bowling effort of the tour, cleaning up the tail.

Australia's biggest challenge in the post-Test tour matches was against the Leveson-Gower's XI. During the last Australian tour in 1938, the team was effectively a full-strength England outfit, but this time Bradman insisted only six England players from the season's Tests be allowed to compete. After his opponents had finalised their team, Bradman fielded a full-strength team, and Brown missed out. The match ended in a draw after multiple rain delays.

The tour ended with two non-first-class matches against Scotland. In the first match, Brown was rested as the Australians claimed an innings victory. In the second match, Brown scored 24 not out batting at No. 8 and took a wicket in the second innings as Australia ended the tour with another innings victory.

Role

An experienced right-handed opening batsman, Brown was on his third campaign in England, having first toured in 1934 before the World War II. However, Brown's best years were lost to the war and by 1948, Barnes and Morris had risen above him in the pecking order and become Australia's first-choice opening pair. Brown was selected as the reserve opener, a decision that generated controversy among pundits who believed he was past his best.

During the tour matches, which were usually played consecutively with only one or no days between fixtures, Bradman rotated the trio of openers, so one would generally be rested while the other two opened,N- but in the Tests, Morris and Barnes were preferred. Bradman accommodated Brown in his first-choice team by playing him out of position in the middle order in the first two Tests and against Worcestershire and the MCC, when he fielded the strongest XI. However, Brown appeared uncomfortable in the unfamiliar role, and after making 73 runs at 24.33 in the first two Tests, he was dropped.

Nevertheless, Brown was successful in the tour matches when he played as an opener. He ended the tour with eight centuries and a total of 1,448 first-class runs at an average of 57.92, behind only Bradman, Hassett and Morris in the runs and averages, with a highest score of 200 against Cambridge University. Brown's tally of eight centuries was second only to Bradman, and took his tally on English soil to 18 first-class tons. Excluding the matches against Worcestershire, the MCC and the first two Tests, in which Brown had scored 25, 26, 17, 24 and 32 batting in the middle order while Barnes and Morris opened, Brown scored 1,324 runs at 66.20 while opening in the other matches, which would have put him in a clear fourth place on the batting averages. Following his omission from the Test team midway through the tour, Brown batted in a slow and conservative manner in order to score more runs and regain his position, much to the chagrin of the crowds.

A very occasional off spinner, Brown took 4/16 against the South of England in his only first-class bowling assignment of the tour. It was his best career bowling figures—he accumulated only six wickets in his first-class career. He also took 18 catches in the first-class fixtures.

Notes

Statistical note

n-[1]

This statement can be verified by consulting all of the scorecards for the matches, as listed here.

General notes

References

 

The Invincibles (cricket)